Medicine Hat High School (Hat High) is a high school of approximately 1300 students. It is located in Medicine Hat, Alberta, Canada. It is a member of School District 76 (SD76), Medicine Hat's main public district and has the largest capacity of all schools within Medicine Hat, Alberta. 

MHHS was originally built in 1952. The majority of its current main construction took place in 1962.  It was again modernized from 2015 to 2017 at a cost of approximately $37.2M.  The modernization process was completed in 2017.

The MHHS building housed what is now The Medicine Hat College until 1971, at which point The MHC moved to its own campus location on College Drive. 

On October 5, 2017 MHHS hosted a major homecoming event for former athletes and families to celebrate the modernization of the school and its history.

On Thursday September 3, 2020, Medicine Hat High School announced it will be discontinuing the use of their Indigenous-themed team names after months of consultations.

On April 6, Medicine Hat High School will be changing their team name to the 'Hawks' after considering input from the school community.

Programs 

The Medicine Hat High School offers a drama program.

Athletics 

MHHS MOHAWKS FOOTBALL

Provincial Champions.
1989 - Mohawks
2001 - Mohawks

Rangeland Champions. 
1982 - Mohawks
1986 - Mohawks
1987 - Mohawks
1988 - Mohawks
1989 - Mohawks
2000 - Mohawks
2001 - Mohawks
2002 - Mohawks
2003 - Mohawks
2004 - Mohawks
2005 - Mohawks
2006 - Mohawks
2011 - Mohawks
2014 - Mohawks

South Zone Champions.
2001 - Mohawks
2002 - Mohawks
2004 - Mohawks
2005 - Mohawks
2006 - Mohawks
2008 - Mohawks
2011 - Mohawks

2014 - Mohawks

MHHS MOHAWKS RUGBY

Provincial Champions.
2011 - Mohawks

South Zone Champions.
2010 - Mohawks
2011 - Mohawks

MHHS MOHAWKS BASKETBALL

MHHS KWAHOMMIES BASKETBALL

MHHS MOHAWKS VOLLEYBALL

MHHS KWAHOMMIES BASKETBALL

MHHS CROSS COUNTRY AND TRACK

2017 Alberta Provincial Champions.

References

High schools in Alberta
Medicine Hat
Educational institutions in Canada with year of establishment missing